Labyrinthus leucodon is a species of air-breathing land snail, a terrestrial pulmonate gastropod mollusk in the family Labyrinthidae.

Description 
The periphery of the shell of this species is acutely angulated. The spire is normally elevated, and the sides of the spire are flat to slightly rounded. The shell aperture is moderately deflected. Within the aperture, the high, simple parietal lamella starts descending before it runs into the parietal lip. The basal lip has a broad, prominent knob. The lower palatal tooth is a prominent, crescentic lamella, with strong lateral buttresses. The upper palatal lip often has a small tuberculate denticle.

The periostracum is brownish in color, occasionally speckled with greenish yellow.

Distribution 
This species occurs in:
 Venezuela (reported for the states of Carabobo,  Distrito Capital, Falcón, Mérida, Vargas and Yaracuy)
 Colombia

See also 
 List of molluscs of Falcón State, Venezuela
 List of non-marine molluscs of Venezuela

References

External links 
 Discover Life: Labyrinthus leucodon (Pfeiffer, 1847)
 Global Names Index: Labyrinthus leucodon

Labyrinthidae
Gastropods described in 1847